Ilias-Angelos Theodoridis (born February 5, 1997) is a Greek professional basketball player. He is a 1.96 m (6 ft 5 in) tall point guard.

Pro career
Theodoridis started his basketball career in 2011 playing amateur basketball with Irakleio. He stayed at the club until 2016. 

He signed his first professional contract with Rethymno Cretan Kings of the Greek Basket League on 2016.  Theodoridis made his professional debut with Rethymno against Apollon Patras on October 10, 2015. He scored his first 5 points against Panathinaikos on February 1, 2016.

References

External links
Profile at esake.gr
Profile at basketball-reference.com
Profile at draftexpress.com

1997 births
Living people
Irakleio B.C. players
Greek Basket League players
Point guards
Rethymno B.C. players